Luciana Ángeles Molina (born 20 September 1994) is an Argentinian field hockey player.

Hockey career 
Molina was part of the Argentina Junior National Team at the 2013 Junior World Cup where the team won the silver medal.

In 2015, Molina took part of the team that earned a silver medal ar the 2015 Pan American Games.

References

Living people
1994 births
Argentine female field hockey players
Pan American Games medalists in field hockey
Pan American Games silver medalists for Argentina
Field hockey players at the 2015 Pan American Games
Medalists at the 2015 Pan American Games
Sportspeople from Mendoza, Argentina